Milajerd castle is a historical castle located in Komijan County in Markazi Province, The longevity of this fortress dates back to the Historical periods after Islam.

References 

Castles in Iran